Hüls is the most northerly district of Krefeld, North Rhine-Westphalia, Germany. Formerly an independent municipality, Hüls has been part of the city of Krefeld since 1975. It was the site of damask and velvet manufacturing.

History 
Stone Age and Roman Time

A few flint artifacts from the Neolithic (5500 -  2000 BC) are proof of human activity on the territory of what is now Hüls. A few graves from the Iron Age have been discovered near what is now Botzweg.

References

Krefeld
Former municipalities in North Rhine-Westphalia